Peter Livingston Holsapple (born February 19, 1956) is an American musician who formed, along with Chris Stamey,  the dB's, a jangle-pop band from Winston-Salem, North Carolina. He became the band's principal songwriter and singer after Stamey's departure. The band, with Stamey back in the fold, reformed with new material in 2005–2006.

Biography 
Holsapple was born in Greenwich, Connecticut, moving with his family to Winston-Salem, North Carolina, in 1962. He graduated from R. J. Reynolds High School.

He played in bands since 1964, professionally since 1970. His band Rittenhouse Square, which included Mitch Easter, Chris Stamey, and Bobby Locke, released an independent album in 1972. When Rittenhouse broke up, Holsapple joined future dB's drummer Will Rigby and several other high school friends in Little Diesel, a proto-punk rock band that ran against the tastes of Southern rock. Little Diesel's album No Lie (produced by Chris Stamey in 1974) was released on twenty 8-track cartridges, and it was finally re-released in 2006 on Telstar Records. College broke the band up, but Holsapple continued to write and sing, eventually moving to New York from Memphis, where he had recorded at Sam Phillips Studio with Big Star engineer Richard Rosebrough, three months into the dB's existence. He joined as keyboard player and backing vocalist, but he quickly began submitting his songs, playing guitar, and singing lead vocals alongside Stamey.

After the dB's broke up in 1988, Holsapple worked as a full-time auxiliary guitarist and keyboardist for R.E.M. on the Green world tour. He participated in the writing and development, as well as the recording, of their 1991 multi-platinum release Out of Time, but subsequently left his sideman role with R.E.M. due to rumoured disputes over songwriting credits. Holsapple subsequently worked with Hootie & the Blowfish as an auxiliary musician.

Holsapple joined the Continental Drifters (no longer extant), for whom he had first produced some demos, a single, and the Nineteen Ninety-Three album. The band was originally based out of Los Angeles but the members eventually relocated to New Orleans. The band included members of the Dream Syndicate, the Bangles, and the Cowsills. Holsapple subsequently married Susan Cowsill and had one child with her, a daughter. The group went on to record three well-received albums, an EP of Sandy Denny and Richard Thompson covers, and several tribute album tracks, none of which translated into a lot of sales. Holsapple and Cowsill divorced in 2001.

In the aftermath of Hurricane Katrina, Holsapple relocated from New Orleans to Durham, North Carolina.

In 1991, he and Stamey reunited to record an album entitled Mavericks, and in 1997 he released his first solo album, Out of My Way.

In September 2005, the classic line-up of the dB's performed two shows in Chicago and two in Hoboken, New Jersey. December 2006 brought Stamey-Holsapple Christmas shows in North Carolina. The Bowery Ballroom in NYC hosted the dB'S in January 2007, and in February 2007 the dB's made a brief appearance at Cat's Cradle in Carrboro, North Carolina.

Holsapple and Stamey released a new duo album, Here and Now, on Bar/None Records in June 2009.  This album featured a cover of the British progressive rock band Family's 1972 single "My Friend the Sun."

In 2012, Holsapple reunited with the dB's to complete their first new studio album in 25 years and their first in 30 years with the original 1978 lineup. Falling Off the Sky was released on Bar/None Records on June 12, 2012.

Holsapple released a solo single, "Don't Mention The War" b/w "Cinderella Style", on his own Hawthorne Curve Records on February 3, 2017, and released his second solo album, Game Day, in July 2018 on the Omnivore Recordings label.

References

External links

1956 births
American rock guitarists
American male guitarists
Songwriters from North Carolina
Living people
R.E.M. personnel
Musicians from Greenwich, Connecticut
Musicians from Winston-Salem, North Carolina
The Golden Palominos members
Musicians from Durham, North Carolina
Guitarists from Connecticut
Guitarists from North Carolina
20th-century American guitarists